Victor Bright from the University of Colorado, Boulder, CO was named Fellow of the Institute of Electrical and Electronics Engineers (IEEE) in 2015 for contributions to micro- and nano-electromechanical systems.

References

Fellow Members of the IEEE
Living people
Year of birth missing (living people)
Place of birth missing (living people)
University of Colorado Boulder faculty
American electrical engineers